Virginia’s fifth congressional district is a United States congressional district in the commonwealth of Virginia. The 5th district includes the majority of Southside Virginia. Within the district are the cities of Charlottesville, Danville, and Lynchburg.

The district’s first representative in Congress was James Madison,  who defeated James Monroe in the district's first congressional election. Madison and Monroe would go on to serve as the 4th and 5th Presidents of the United States. The current Congressman is Republican Bob Good. 
Historically, the 5th was one of the first districts of Virginia to turn Republican in presidential elections – though unlike the 6th where the decisive factor was ticket-splitting by Byrd Organization Democrats, here the decisive factor was the growth of middle-class Republicanism in the Charlottesville metropolitan area. In the decade preceding the Voting Rights Act, these were joined by a significant proportion of Virginia’s limited and almost entirely white electorate who preferred conservative positions on black civil rights. The district was to be one of two in Virginia which gave a plurality of the vote to segregationist George Wallace in 1968, and has never supported a Democrat for president since Harry S. Truman in 1948.

However, the district was continuously represented in Congress by fairly conservative Democrats until Virgil H. Goode Jr. switched parties, first to independent and then to Republican. In 2008, Democrat Tom Perriello defeated Goode with significant Democratic down-ballot coattails from the Obama campaign. Republican Robert Hurt defeated Perriello in 2010, going on to serve three terms. After Hurt left office, the district continued to elect Republicans, including Tom Garrett, Denver Riggleman, who both served one term, and Bob Good, who was re-elected in 2022.

Demographics 
According to the APM Research Lab's Voter Profile Tools (featuring the U.S. Census Bureau's 2019 American Community Survey), the district contained about 580,000 potential voters (citizens, age 18+). Of these, 75% are White and 20% are Black. Immigrants make up 3% of the district's potential voters. Median income among households (with one or more potential voter) in the district is about $57,700, while 12% of households live below the poverty line. As for the educational attainment of potential voters in the district, 12% of those 25 and older have not earned a high school degree, while 27% hold a bachelor's or higher degree.

Area covered
It covers all or part of the following political subdivisions:

Counties
The entirety of:
 Amelia County
 Amherst County
 Appomattox County
 Buckingham County
 Campbell County
 Charlotte County
 Cumberland County
 Fluvanna County
 Goochland County
 Halifax County
 Lousia County
 Lunenburg County
 Mecklenburg County
 Nelson County
 Nottoway County
 Powhatan County
 Pittsylvania County
 Prince Edward County

Portions of:
 Albemarle County
 Bedford County
 Hanover County

Cities
Charlottesville (main site of the University of Virginia)
Danville
Farmville
Lynchburg

Recent results in statewide elections 
Results Under Current Lines (Since 2023)

Recent election results

2022 
Virginia's 5th Congressional District House Election, November 2022

Incumbent Bob Good defeated Josh Throneburg in the November general election on Tuesday, November 8, 2022.

2020 
Virginia's 5th Congressional District House Election, November 2020

Republican Bob Good defeated Dr. Cameron Webb in the November general election on Tuesday, November 3, 2020.

2018 
Virginia's 5th Congressional District House Election, November 2018

Took place on Tuesday, November 6, 2018, with Republican Denver Riggleman winning the election. The incumbent, Tom Garrett, did not run for re-election.

2016 
Virginia's 5th Congressional District House Election, November 2016

List of members representing the district

Historical district boundaries

See also

Virginia's congressional districts
List of United States congressional districts

References 

 Congressional Biographical Directory of the United States 1774–present

External links
5th CD Democratic Committee website
5th CD Republican Committee website

05
Constituencies established in 1789
1789 establishments in Virginia
Constituencies disestablished in 1933
1933 disestablishments in Virginia
Constituencies established in 1935
1935 establishments in Virginia